Kani Sib (also Romanized as Kānī Sīb) is a village in Kani Bazar Rural District of Khalifan District of Mahabad County, West Azerbaijan province, Iran. At the 2006 National Census, its population was 470 in 76 households. The following census in 2011 counted 453 people in 88 households. The latest census in 2016 showed a population of 380 people in 123 households; it was the largest village in its rural district.

References 

Mahabad County

Populated places in West Azerbaijan Province

[[Category:Populated places in Mahabad County